Balagolla is a small village in Sri Lanka about  away from the city of Kandy. Balagolla is located in Kandy District in Sri Lanka's Central Province.

History
Originally, Balagolla area was a coffee and cocoa plantation in the times of British occupation in Kandy. As a result of the construction of Victoria Dam under Accelerated Mahaweli Development Programme (AMDP), displaced people of Teldeniya and Kundasale were settled in Balagolla area in the early 1980s.

Establishment
This village was established in 1983 as a resettlement land for the families who lost their lands due to Mahaweli Development Scheme.

Geography
Balagolla is located in Dumbara Valley of Sri Lanka. The Pallekele International Cricket Stadium is situated in Balagolla.

Demographics

See also
 List of towns in Central Province, Sri Lanka
 Sri Lankan Civil War

External links

References

Populated places in Central Province, Sri Lanka
Populated places established in 1983